Georgina Geikie (born 6 December 1984) is a British sport shooter who competed for Great Britain in the 2012 Summer Olympics.

Early life
Geikie was born in Okehampton, Devon.  She studied for a degree in Product Design at Cardiff University.

Sports
At the 2006 Commonwealth Games held in Melbourne, Australia, Geikie teamed up with Julia Lyndall to win the bronze medal in the women's 10 meters air pistol pairs behind gold medallists Dina Aspandiyarova and Lalita Yauhleuskaya of Australia and silver medallists Joseline Lee Yean Cheah and Bibiana Pei Chin Ng from Malaysia.

At the 2010 Commonwealth Shooting Championships Geikie won four medals; two individual bronzes and a silver and bronze in team events.  She competed for England at the 2010 Commonwealth Games held in Delhi, India. Again partnered by Julia Lyndall, the pair repeated their result at the 2006 Games by winning a bronze medal in the women's 25 metre pistol pairs with a score of 1122 points.  Despite her medal Geikie lost her place as one of the six athletes funded by British Shooting with money provided by UK Sport following a bi-annual review of performances.

At the 2011 European Shooting Championships in Belgrade, Greikie achieved the Olympic qualifying standard in the 25 metres pistol event earning Great Britain a second qualifying berth for the event in addition to their host nation place. Her score of 578 points meant she finished 13th out of the 48 competitors.

Geikie was chosen to carry the Olympic Flame as it passed through Okehampton on 21 May as part of the 2012 Summer Olympics torch relay. Geikie was selected as one of ten shooters to represent Great Britain at the 2012 Summer Olympics in London. She competed in the women's 25 metres pistol event, finishing 37th with a score of 562 and the 10m pistol event finishing 47th with a score of 359.

References

1984 births
Living people
People from Okehampton
British female sport shooters
Olympic shooters of Great Britain
Shooters at the 2012 Summer Olympics
Commonwealth Games bronze medallists for England
Shooters at the 2010 Commonwealth Games
Shooters at the 2006 Commonwealth Games
Alumni of Cardiff University
Commonwealth Games medallists in shooting
Medallists at the 2006 Commonwealth Games
Medallists at the 2010 Commonwealth Games